Katie Holmes  is a professor of history at La Trobe University, Melbourne, Australia. She was elected Fellow of the Academy of the Social Sciences in Australia in 2019.

Bibliography

Books
Spaces in Her Day: Australian Women's Diaries of the 1920s and 1930s (1996) 
Between The Leaves: Stories Of Australian Women, Writing and Gardens (2011)

References

External links
Holmes' profile at La Trobe University
Interview about Between the Leaves on ABC Radio National show The Book Show

Academic staff of La Trobe University
Living people
Place of birth missing (living people)
Year of birth missing (living people)
Fellows of the Academy of the Social Sciences in Australia